Say No More in Person is a live album by Bob Ostertag, released in 1993 by Transit.

Track listing

Personnel
Adapted from the Say No More in Person liner notes.

Musicians
 Joey Baron – percussion
 Mark Dresser – bass guitar
 Phil Minton – voice
 Bob Ostertag – sampler, liner notes

Production and design
 Jacqueline Csuss – liner notes
 Sylvia Eckermann – illustrations
 Reinhard Mayr – photography
 Ilia Vasella – design
 Gerhard Wieser – engineering
 David Wojnarowicz – photography

Release history

References

External links 
 Say No More in Person at Bandcamp
 Say No More in Person at Discogs (list of releases)

1993 live albums
Bob Ostertag albums